Kyzylart Pass is a mountain pass and border crossing in the Trans-Alay Range on the border of Tajikistan and Kyrgyzstan. The highest point is 4,280 m (14,042 ft). The border checkpoint on the Kyrgyz side is Bor-Döbö. The area is typically rugged and dry. It is crossed by the Pamir Highway which leads south from Sary-Tash in the Alay Valley up onto the Pamir plateau toward Karakol Lake and Murghab, Tajikistan. In the late nineteenth century the Russians explored and eventually occupied the Pamir plateau.

References

 Laurence Mitchell, Kyrgyzstan, Bradt travel guides, 2008
 Robert Middleton and Huw Thomas, Tajikistan and the High Pamirs, Odyssey Books, 2008

Gallery

Mountain passes of Tajikistan
Mountain passes of Kyrgyzstan
Kyrgyzstan–Tajikistan border crossings
Mountain passes of the Pamir